Steve Siegel (born September 4, 1948) is a former professional tennis player from the United States.

Biography
Siegel, who grew up in Teaneck, New Jersey, won the New Jersey individual tennis state championship in 1966 as a student at Teaneck High School, after finishing as state runner up in 1964. He then played briefly on the international tennis circuit in the 1970s.

He didn't make an impact on the singles tour, but won a set against Arthur Ashe at a WTC tournament in Washington DC in 1972.

The following year he made two main draw appearances in Grand Slam singles draws, the 1973 French Open and 1973 US Open.

He won a Grand Prix doubles title at the Cedar Grove Open in 1974, partnering Australian player Kim Warwick. In the final they defeated Dick Crealy and Bob Tanis in three sets.

His subsequent US Open appearances were in doubles, he made the second round of the 1975 US Open men's doubles with Steven Turner and the second round of 1976 US Open mixed doubles with Janice Metcalf.

Grand Prix career finals

Doubles: 1 (1–0)

References

External links
 
 

1948 births
Living people
American male tennis players
Tennis people from New Jersey
Sportspeople from Bergen County, New Jersey
Teaneck High School alumni